Kamal al-Din al-Nabhani (January 3, 1929 – December 31, 2006) was a Lebanese politician who was one of the founders of the Islamist political party of Hizb ut-Tahrir.

Early life 
Kamal al-Din al-Nabhani was born on January 3, 1929, in Beirut, Lebanon.

Thoughts

Philosophy and theology 
In his books Thought and System of Islam 2 (based on the work of his father Taqi al-Din al-Nabhani), Nabhani placed heavy emphasis on modes and models of the psychology behind human thought and its concepts. He defined the thought process and how it becomes a conviction or concept. He discussed the internal working of thoughts, convictions, and concepts in shaping the Nafs (emotions and sentiments). He also explained how people reach conclusions and the psychology behind the process. This process derives from his father's roots in non-Ascetic legalistic Sufism and from his first teacher and maternal grandfather, Ismail al-Nabhani.

Nabhani's definitions of thought have been used in the study of computer science, artificial intelligence, and information processing and in London South Bank University's information technology department.

After many philosophical discussions on the nature of thoughts and emotions, Nabhani concludes that the only way to bring about change is through discussion, refutation, and revival of the relevant thoughts and emotions. From this philosophical basis, he argues that force does not work to change peoples' ideas. He also argues that a decline in Muslims' mental, emotional, and conceptual lives led to the decline of Muslim culture and the eventual destruction of the Caliphate. He believed the first major step in the decline of Muslim culture was confusion and conflict with new foreign ideas, mainly Greek, Persian, and Eastern philosophy.

He argues that the Islamic world does not know how to address and contextualize these ideas because they have become insular and complacent instead of preserving Islamic thought and philosophy and keeping it relevant to a world in flux. The heavy emphasis on pinpointing, defining, and changing peoples thoughts, convictions, or emotions via stronger thoughts, diagnosis, and refutation of the process an individual uses to reach their particular "incorrect" view has become a recurring argument used by the Hizb ut-Tahrir political party on most issues.

Faith vs. rational belief
Nabhani claimed that Islam is founded on the rational belief and not blind faith, quite similar to Ghazali's Kalam argument. However, both Nabhani and Ghazali argued that after Aqeeda (belief) is established, divine laws in the Quran are beyond question due to the "mind" of God being beyond human comprehension. Nabhani loosely affirmed rationalism (though not that of the Mu'tazili), but argued that it can establish belief in a God just like Ghazali and Ghazali's teacher al-Juwayni, contrary to the common western notion of rationalism. Nabhani tried to outline materialist arguments and axioms to prove that one unlimited creator of the universe, God (Allah), can be proven by rational deduction. He believed that both the dependency and limited physical nature of every tangible thing within human perception ultimately point to an unlimited creator who is beyond need and dependency, an absolute infinite.

Books
Saving Palestine - 1950
The Message of the Arabs - 1950
The System for Society - 1950
The Ruling System in Islam - 1953
The Economic System In Islam - 1953
The Social System in Islam - 1953
The Party Structure - 1953
The Concepts of Hizb ut-Tahrir - 1953
The Islamic State - 1953
The Islamic Personality (in three volumes) - 1960
Political Concepts of Hizb ut-Tahrir - 1969
Political View of Hizb ut-Tahrir - 1972
Introduction to the Constitution or the Reasons That Make it Obligatory - 1963
The Khilafah - 1967
Presence of Mind - 1976
A Burning Call to the Muslims from Hizb ut-Tahrir - 1965
Thinking - 1973
The Jurisprudence of Prayer

References

 
 
 
 
 
 

1929 births
2006 deaths
Arab people in Mandatory Palestine
Palestinian Islamists
Members of Hizb ut-Tahrir
Al-Azhar University alumni